Shyambazar is a station of the Kolkata Metro located in the Shyambazar area. It is the sixth metro station of Line 1 of Kolkata Metro from the north.

History

Construction

The station

Structure
Shyambazar is underground metro station, situated on the Kolkata Metro Line 1 of Kolkata Metro.

Layout

Station layout

Connections

Bus
Bus route number 3B, 3C/1, 3C/2, 3D, 3D/1, 30B, 30B/1, 30C, 30D, 32A, 34B, 34C, 47B, 78, 78/1, 79B, 91, 91A, 91C, 93, 201, 202, 211A, 214, 214A, 215/1, 219, 219/1, 222, 227, 230, 234, 234/1, 240, DN18, KB16, KB22, K1, K4, JM2, 007, 7 (Mini), S158 (Mini), S159 (Mini), S160 (Mini), S161 (Mini), S163 (Mini), S164 (Mini), S168 (Mini), S176 (Mini), S180 (Mini), S181 (Mini), S185 (Mini), S189 (Mini), C11, C28, E32, S9A, S10, S11, S15G, S21, S32, S57, T8, AC20, AC40, AC54, EB1A etc. serve the station.

Train 
Kolkata railway station and Tala railway station are the nearest rail stations. Bidhannagar Road railway station is also located nearby.

Tram
Tram route number 5 serves the station.

Entry/Exit

Gallery

See also

Kolkata
List of Kolkata Metro stations
Transport in Kolkata
Kolkata Metro Rail Corporation
Kolkata Suburban Railway
Kolkata Monorail
Trams in Kolkata
Shyambazar
List of rapid transit systems
List of metro systems

References

External links
 
 Official Website for line 1
 UrbanRail.Net – descriptions of all metro systems in the world, each with a schematic map showing all stations.

Kolkata Metro stations
Railway stations in Kolkata